Pikauba may refer to:

 Lac-Pikauba, Quebec, unorganized territory in Charlevoix Regional County Municipality, Capitale-Nationale
 Pikauba Lake, body of water in  Lac-Pikauba, Quebec
 Pikauba (cheese), a semi-firm farmer cheese made by hand in the region Saguenay–Lac-Saint-Jean in Quebec